Jesús Dagoberto Perdomo Chávez (born 13 October 1967 in Santa Bárbara, Honduras) is a Honduran doctor and politician. He currently serves as deputy of the National Congress of Honduras representing the Liberal Party of Honduras for Santa Bárbara.

References

1967 births
Living people
People from Santa Bárbara Department, Honduras
Deputies of the National Congress of Honduras
Liberal Party of Honduras politicians
Honduran physicians